The Tomb of Turhan Sultan is the mausoleum of five Ottoman sultans, located at Fatih in Istanbul, Turkey. It was built in 1663 for Turhan Sultan, chief queen consort of Sultan Ibrahim and mother of Sultan Mehmed IV.

Overview
The tomb is situated on the corner of Bankacılar St. and Yeni Cami St. in Eminönü quarter of Fatih in Istanbul. It was built in 1663 for Haseki sultan and Valide sultan Turhan Sultan (c. 1627–1683). She was the chief queen consort of Sultan Ibrahim (reigned 1640–1648) and the mother of Sultan Mehmed IV (r. 1648–1687). The tomb was built as part of the New Mosque complex, of which construction was started in 1598 by Safiye Sultan (c. 1550 – c. 1619), the chief queen consort of Sultan Murad III (r. 1574–1595), the mother of Sultan Mehmed III (r. 1595–1603) as well as the grandmother of Sultans Ahmed I (r. 1603–1617) and Mustafa I (r. 1617–1618, 1622–1623), and completed by Turhan Hatice Sultan in 1665. The tomb contains 44 graves in total. In addition to Turhan Sultan, five sultans, Mehmed IV, Mustafa II (r. 1695–1703), Ahmed III (r. 1703–1730), Mahmud I (r. 1730–1754) and Osman III (r. 1754–1757), rest in the tomb. Other notables are shahzadehs and sultanas, namely princes, princesses, and queen consorts as relatives of the sultans.

Architecture
The tomb was built by court architect Mustafa Agha. It was designed in square-plan having a porch of the size  in front of its entrance gate. The porch's dome is carried by pendant vaults and arched vaults built with interchangeably white and red stones. The porch is decorated with tiles and carvings.  The rectangular panels on the porch walls contain each a red and pale green rosette on white ground. The panels have decorative fillings on the corners. On the right side of the gate, an inscription reads literally "Oh! my Allah, who opens the doors, open auspicial doors to us".

Windows in two rows around the building, with exception on the porch side, bring light inside the tomb. The lower row windows are rectangular and are barred while the upper row windows have pointed-arch design. The tomb's interior is decorated with Iznik tiles and carvings. The original decorations on the walls and at the dome interior were recovered during the restoration works in 1959. In the 19th and 20th centuries, some carvings were added as copies of the original ones in the medallions and rosettes. A tile belt surrounding the interior contains the inscription of the 1st-30th āyāt of the Quranic surah Al-Mulk. An inscription in two lines of Taʿlīq script was attached into the western wall of the tomb during the burial of Sultan Mehmed IV. Sultan Ahmed III  built a library on the right side of the porch. In later years, two more tombs, named "Havatin" and "Cedid Havatin", were built next to the tomb.

References

Ottoman architecture in Turkey
Turhan Hatice
Buildings and structures completed in 1663
1663 establishments in the Ottoman Empire
Religious buildings and structures in Istanbul
Fatih